Inverness Celtic Football Club was a Scottish football team from Inverness. They won the North Caledonian Football League in its inaugural season. The following year, in 1897–98, participated in the Highland Football League, finishing fifth out of nine teams.

References

Defunct football clubs in Scotland
Former Highland Football League teams
Former North Caledonian Football League teams
Football clubs in Inverness